762 Pulcova is a main-belt asteroid. It was discovered by Grigoriy N. Neujmin in 1913, and is named after Pulkovo Observatory, near Saint Petersburg. Pulcova is 137 km in diameter, and is a C-type asteroid, which means that it is dark in colouring with a carbonate composition.

Photometric observations of this asteroid from Leura, Australia during 2006 gave a light curve with a period of 5.8403 ± 0.0005 hours and a brightness variation of 0.20 ± 0.02 in magnitude. This result is in agreement with previous studies.

Satellite 

On February 22, 2000, astronomers at the Canada-France-Hawaii Telescope on Mauna Kea, Hawaii, discovered a 15-km moon (roughly a tenth the size of the primary) orbiting Pulcova at a distance of 800 km. Its orbital period is 4 days. The satellite is about 4 magnitudes fainter than the primary.  It was one of the first asteroid moons to be identified.

Density 
In the year 2000, Merline estimated Pulcova to have a density of 1.8 g/cm3, which would make it more dense than the trinary asteroid 45 Eugenia, and binary 90 Antiope. But estimates by Marchis in 2008 suggest a density of only 0.90 g/cm3, suggesting it may be a loosely packed rubble pile, not a monolithic object.

References

External links 
 Asteroids with Satellites, Robert Johnston, johnstonsarchive.net
 
 

000762
Pulcova
Pulcova
000762
000762
19130903
20000222